Hanna Rahmé, OLM (born on 18 July 1960 in Aynata, BAALBACK Governorate, Lebanon) is the current Maronite eparch of the Maronite Catholic Eparchy of Baalbek-Deir El Ahmar.

Life

Hanna Rahmé entered on 6 August 1979 in the OLM and on 6 August 1989 made his religious vows. He received on 29 July 1990 his ordination to the priesthood.

The decision of the Synod of Maronite Church from 10 to 14 March 2015 convened to elected him bishop of Baalbek-Deir El Ahmar. Pope Francis approved his election as Bishop of Baalbek-Deir El Ahmar on 20 June 2015.

Rahmé was consecrated bishop on 1 August 2015 by Maronite Patriarch of Antioch Cardinal Bechara Boutros al-Rahi, OMM and his co-consecrators were Simon Atallah, Emeritus eparch of Baalbek-Deir El Ahmar, and Paul-Mounged El-Hachem, Titular bishop of Darnis.

References

External links

 http://www.catholic-hierarchy.org/bishop/brahme.html
 http://www.gcatholic.org/dioceses/diocese/baal1.htm

1960 births
Lebanese Maronites
21st-century Maronite Catholic bishops
Living people
People from Bint Jbeil District